Varicella may refer to:

 Chickenpox, a disease caused by infection with varicella zoster
 Varicella vaccine, a vaccine that protects against chickenpox and shingles
 Varicella zoster virus, a virus that causes chickenpox and shingles
 Varicella (video game), a 1999 video game
 Varicella, a snail genus in the family Oleacinidae

See also
 Chickenpox (disambiguation)
 Simian varicella virus